Teverga (Asturian: Teberga) is a municipality in the Autonomous Community of the Principality of Asturias, Spain. It is bordered on the north by Belmonte de Miranda, Grado, Yernes y Tameza, and Proaza; to the south by León province, to the west by Somiedo and to the east by Quirós and Proaza.

Formerly a mining area, now its economy is based on agriculture and emerging tourism. The tourism is based on the area's beauty and historical interest. The peak Sobia is distinguished by its impressive vertical walls of limestone and its flat top. The collegiate church of San Pedro, in a high medieval style, dates from between 1069 and 1076. One can explore the mountains and the 12-km long Huerta Cave, the Senda del Oso bicycle path, or a museum of prehistory.

In 2013, Teverga was prized with the Exemplary Town of Asturias Award, of the Prince of Asturias Awards. Because of this recognition, Felipe, Prince of Asturias, visited the town in October 2013.

Parishes
Barrio (Barriu; Bairru)
Carrea
La Focella (La Fouciecha; La Foceicha)
La Plaza
Páramo (Parmu)
Riello (Rieḷḷu)
San Salvador d'Alesga
Santianes
Taja (Taxa)
Torce
Urria
Villamayor (Viḷḷamor)
Villanueva (Viḷḷanueva; Viḷḷanuöva)

Politics

Gallery

Natural wonders
 Caldoveiro Peak

References

External links
Federación Asturiana de Concejos 
Infoteverga, información turística de Teverga 
Arte, Asociación de hostelería de Teverga 

Municipalities in Asturias